Frank de Wit (born 13 February 1996) is a Dutch judoka. He competed at the 2016 Summer Olympics in the men's 81 kg event, in which he was eliminated by Ivaylo Ivanov in the second round.

In January 2021, he won the silver medal in his event at the 2021 Judo World Masters held in Doha, Qatar. In June 2021, he won one of the bronze medals in the men's 81 kg at the 2021 World Judo Championships held in Budapest, Hungary.

On 12 November 2022 he won a silver medal at the 2022 European Mixed Team Judo Championships as part of team Netherlands.

References

External links
 
 
 

1996 births
Living people
Dutch male judoka
Judoka at the 2016 Summer Olympics
Olympic judoka of the Netherlands
Judoka at the 2014 Summer Youth Olympics
European Games competitors for the Netherlands
Judoka at the 2019 European Games
Judoka at the 2020 Summer Olympics
20th-century Dutch people
21st-century Dutch people